Charles Byrd "Bugs" Grover (June 20, 1890 – May 24, 1971) was a Major League Baseball pitcher. In two career games, he had a 0–0 record with a 3.38 ERA. He batted left-handed and threw right-handed.

Grover was born in Gallipolis, Ohio and died in Emmett Township, Michigan.

External links
Baseball Reference.com page

1890 births
1971 deaths
Detroit Tigers players
Major League Baseball pitchers
Baseball players from Ohio
Maysville Rivermen players
Topeka Jayhawks players
Sioux City Indians players
St. Joseph Drummers players
Hutchinson Wheatshockers players
St. Joseph Saints players
Minneapolis Millers (baseball) players
Sioux City Packers players
Lincoln Links players